Stefano Pellizzari (born 3 January 1997) is an Italian footballer who plays as a defender for  club Fermana.

Club career
Pellizzari made his Austrian Football First League debut for WSG Wattens on 21 July 2017 in a game against TSV Hartberg.

On 24 July 2019, he returned to Ravenna on a permanent basis. On 20 January 2020, his contract with Ravenna was terminated.

On 23 January 2020 he signed with Serie C club Reggio Audace until the end of that season.

On 14 September 2020 he moved to Legnago.

On 14 July 2021 he joined Vis Pesaro on a two-year contract. On 21 January 2022, he returned on loan to Legnago.

On 19 August 2022, Pellizzari signed with Fermana.

References

External links
 

1997 births
People from Correggio, Emilia-Romagna
Footballers from Emilia-Romagna
Sportspeople from the Province of Reggio Emilia
Living people
Italian footballers
Association football defenders
Virtus Entella players
Carrarese Calcio players
WSG Tirol players
Ravenna F.C. players
A.C. Reggiana 1919 players
F.C. Legnago Salus players
Vis Pesaro dal 1898 players
Fermana F.C. players
Serie C players
2. Liga (Austria) players
Italian expatriate footballers
Expatriate footballers in Austria
Italian expatriate sportspeople in Austria